Clodoveo Carrión Mora (1883–1957) was a palaeontologist and naturalist who is regarded as the most prolific and erudite natural scientist of Ecuador of the 20th century.

Early years
Clodoveo Carrión was born in Loja, Ecuador as the second son of Manuel Alejandro Carrión Riofrío (Poet) and Filomena Mora Bermeo. Among his brothers are Hector Manuel (Poet), José Miguel (lawyer, sociologist, senator, rector of the Universidad Nacional de Loja) and Benjamín Carrión.

Clodoveo attended a Catholic primary school La Salle and then a secular high school Colegio Bernardo Valdivieso. As a young man he recognised that he had no aptitude for the letters ---something rare in his family--- but rather for the natural sciences.  To pursue his scientific education, Clodoveo travelled to Europe. He studied at the University of London and at the University of Manchester obtaining the title of Industrial Engineer. During his 10-year stay in Europe he also carried out many studies in Spain and France. He never married and was a very reserved person. Having been born into an affluent family of intellectuals and liberals certainly contributed to achieving his plans.

Back from Europe
Upon returning from Europe, he became Professor of Natural Sciences at the Colegio Bernardo Valdivieso
until his retirement. In 1924 he presented some of his findings to the Panamerican Scientific Congress in Lima, for which he was widely praised. He kept a longtime correspondence and working relationship with distinguished scientists of several renowned international institutions, e.g. with the American palaeontologist Dr. Edward W. Berry of the Johns Hopkins University, Baltimore; with the British geologist Mr. Errol I. White of the British Museum in London; with Dr. Orestes Cendrero of the Instituto General y Técnico de Santander, Spain, and Dr. Waldo L. Schmitt of the American Museum of Natural History. For all his teaching and scientific achievements he obtained the degree of Doctor Honoris causa from the Universidad Nacional de Loja.

Scientific contributions
Carrión was very active in Paleontology and Entomology, fields in which he discovered many species and one genus. His main discoveries were:
 Plants: Elaphoglossum carrioni, Melochia carrioni, and Caussapea carrioni.
 Other paleo-species that he classified belonged to the following groups:  Spotfungi , Bryophyta, Pteridophyta, Monocotyledonae, Dicotyledonae, Urticales, Santalales, Chenopodiales, Ranales, Rosales, Geraniales, Sapindales, Rivimnales, Malvales, Laurales, Myrtales, Ebenales, Gentianales, Rubiales.

These findings were thoroughly described by White (1927) and Berry (1929). Such transcendental discoveries were crucial to understanding the last phase of the geological evolution of the Andes by correlating several sedimentary basins in the American Continent.

In Zoology his main findings were:
 Fish: Carrionellus diomortus and Lipopterichthys carrioni.
 Reptiles: Atractus carrioni ; Bothrops lojanus ; Stenocercus carrioni .
 Arthropods:  Triatoma carrioni (usually called in Spanish chinche de caballo); which is the vector of the Chagas Disease in Southern Ecuador. This finding was documented by F. Larrousse (1926).
 Frogs: Eleutherodactylus carrioni, Hyla carrioni, Gastrotheca marsupiata lojana. The latter is a frog with the peculiarity that during reproduction she incubates her eggs in a special bag that is carried on her back. His findings were thoroughly reported by Parker (1930, 1932, 1934, 1938).
 Coleoptera: many beetles belonging to the families Cerambycidae, Scarabaeidae, Meloidae, Elateridae, and Tenebrionidae.
The beetles that Clodoveo contributed were saved by his nephew Jorge Castillo Carrión, in Loja, Ecuador.

See also
 Ecuadorians

References

Further reading
Berry EW (1929). "Contribution to the Paleontology of Colombia, Ecuador and Perú". Johns Hopkins University Studies in Geology 10: 83.
Carrión C (1930). "El chirimoyo – anona chrimolia ". Revista del Colegio Bernardo Valdivieso (Loja) 4 (5): 313–316. (in Spanish).
Carrión C (1934). "Contribución a la Paleontología ". Revista Universitaria (Loja) 2 (2–3): 150–161. (in Spanish).
Carrión C (1935a). "Breves consideraciones sobre la Paleontología de la Provincia de Loja ". Revista del Colegio Bernardo Valdivieso (Loja) 1 (1): 313–316. (in Spanish).
Carrión C (1935b). "Estudios científicos: insectos fósiles en la Hoya de Loja ". Revista Mediodía, CCE (Loja) 11: 1–14. (in Spanish).
Larrousse F (1926)."Description de deux espéces nouvelles du genre Triatoma: T. carrioni n. sp., et T. pintoi n. sp." Annales de Parasitologie Humaine et Comparé, Faculté de Médecine 4 (2). 136–139. (in French).
Norman JR (1935). "Description of a new loricariid catfish from Ecuador".  Ann. Mag. Nat. Hist., Tenth Series 15: 627–629.
Parker HW (1938). "The vertical distribution of some reptiles and amphibians in Southern Ecuador". Ann. Mag. Nat. Hist., Eleventh Series 2: 438–450.
Parker HW (1930). "Two new reptiles from Southern Ecuador". Ann. Mag. Nat. Hist., Tenth Series 5: 568–571.
Parker HW (1932). "Some new and rare reptiles and amphibians from Southern Ecuador". Ann. Mag. Nat. Hist., Tenth Series 9: 21–26.
Parker HW (1934). "Reptiles and amphibians from Southern Ecuador". Ann. Mag. Nat. Hist., Tenth Series 14: 264–273.
White EI (1927). ? "Carrionellus diomortus ". Ann. Mag. Nat. Hist., Ninth Series 20: 519.

External links
 The American Museum of Natural History
 California Academy of Sciences
 Casa de La Cultura Ecuatoriana Benjamin Carrión
 Latin American Network for Research on the Biology and Control of Triatominae
 Fishbase.org

Ecuadorian biologists
Entomologists
Ecuadorian zoologists
1883 births
1957 deaths
People from Loja, Ecuador
Alumni of the University of London
Alumni of the University of Manchester
20th-century zoologists